Charles Tenney may refer to:
 Charles H. Tenney (1842–1919), one of the "Methuen city fathers" who grew rich in Methuen, Massachusetts during the industrial boom of the late 19th century
 Charles Henry Tenney (1911–1994), United States federal judge
 Charles Daniel Tenney (1857–1930), American educator and diplomat to China